The Bucharest Exchange Trading index (BET or BET-20) was the first index developed by Bucharest Stock Exchange. It is the reference index for the capital markets. BET follows the evolution of 20 most liquid companies listed on BVB regulated market, excluding financial investment companies (SIFs). It is an index weighted by free float capitalization. The maximum weight of the symbol is 20%. The main selection criterion is company’s liquidity. Starting with 2015, additional requirements of transparency, quality reporting and communication with investors are also used for screening.

Constituents
As of July, 2022, the index composition was:

See also
 Bucharest Stock Exchange 
 Economy of Romania
 Foreign trade of Romania
 List of companies of Romania
 List of stock exchanges

References

External links
 Bucharest Stock Exchange

European stock market indices
Economy of Romania